Thomas Paul Caterbone (June 29, 1964 – April 29, 1996) was an American football defensive back and coach. He played in the National Football League as a replacement player for the Philadelphia Eagles.

College career
Caterbone played four seasons at Franklin & Marshall College as a defensive back, return specialist and running back. He was named an Eastern College Athletic Conference All-Star and All-Centennial Conference as a senior. Franklin & Marshall awards the Thomas Caterbone '86 Memorial Award annually to the Diplomat player who "best exemplifies Tom Caterbone's love of football, the spirit of competition and enthusiasm for the game".

Professional and coaching career
Following graduation Caterbone played for Harrisburg Patriots, a semi-professional team. He was signed by the Philadelphia Eagles in October 1987 as a replacement player during the 1987 NFL players strike and played in two games, returning two punts for 13 yards. Caterbone became a coach at J. P. McCaskey High School in Lancaster and later returned to Franklin & Marshall as a wide receivers coach. He also continued to play semi-professional football until 1995.

Personal life
Caterbone's older brother, Michael, also played defensive back at Franklin & Marshall and was also a replacement player during the 1987 season as a member of the Miami Dolphins as well as in the Canadian Football League. The Caterbone brothers are the only Franklin & Marshall football players to play in an NFL game since 1950. Caterbone died of an apparent suicide on April 29, 1996. "Tommy's Field", part of Amos Herr Park in East Hempfield Township, Pennsylvania, is named in honor of Caterbone.

References

External links
Franklin & Marshall's Thomas Caterbone '86 Memorial Award

1964 births
American football defensive backs
Franklin & Marshall Diplomats football players
National Football League replacement players
Players of American football from Pennsylvania
Philadelphia Eagles players
Sportspeople from Lancaster, Pennsylvania
Franklin & Marshall Diplomats football coaches
1996 deaths